Hoyle Casino Empire (Casino Empire in Europe) is a business simulation game on Windows computers, in which the player must run a casino and try to make profit, attract customers and get good ratings. It was developed by an in-house internal development team at Sierra Entertainment and was published by the company as well. It is part of Sierra's Hoyle Casino series.

Gameplay
The goal of Hoyle Casino Empire is to create a thriving casino. There are two modes in the game; Empire Mode and Sandbox Mode. Empire Mode sends the player to one of eight casinos starting with a small one and working up to the biggest casino. In each casino the player will have specific objectives to meet in a limited time in order turn the casino into a successful place. Not meeting the objectives in time will end the game. Sandbox mode allows the player to build whatever casino desired without any objectives to follow or limited time. In this mode, the player is limited to one kind of casino, but can unlock more upon winning them from the Empire Mode.

The player starts in a specific kind of building with a limited amount of starting money, certain areas of space to build, and starting at a First Level Status. A Level Status determines what kind of casino games and services can be built in the casino. Increasing a Level Status requires a sum of cash, a number of customers in the casino and a number of good ratings. The Level Status can go as high as four. The number of customers can be increased by introducing more games and services and the good ratings can be increased by introducing variety, room decor, building extensions, cash donations, deluxe services and satisfying customers' general requirements.

General requirements for customers include cash desks (and ATMs) to withdraw money for gambling, bathrooms, eating establishments, drinking establishments and hotel accommodations. If those general requirements are not met, customers may decide to leave the casino and give bad reviews. Cash donations can only keep dissatisfied customers happy temporarily. Customers come in different classes, ranging from Tourists who carry little cash to VIPs who carry much. When building games and services in the casino, maintenance is needed to keep the casino running. Service men are needed to maintain the slot machines, custodians keep the casino and bathrooms clean, waitresses serve drinks and security guards keep unwanted offenders out.

Earning money legally is done by establishing sufficient services to the number of customers and accepting commercial stunt deals with agreements met. However money can be earned illegitimately by increasing the House Edge to Cheating Mode, accepting crooked deals such as money laundering. Such illegalities can lead to financial losses and degrading of ratings if found out by city authorities. While attempting to earn profit, the player must keep in mind the maintenance and employee wage expenses that present in the gameplay. If money goes below zero, then the player is in debt and cannot spend on anymore services or building until sufficient cash is earned.

Reception

"Hoyle Casino Empire" received a number of mixed reviews.

See also
Casino Tycoon

References

External links

2002 video games
Video games with isometric graphics
Business simulation games
Windows games
Windows-only games
Casino video games
Sierra Entertainment games
Video games set in the Las Vegas Valley
Video games set in Nevada
Video games developed in the United States